is a Japanese football player currently playing for Kashiwa Reysol.

National team career
In August 2007, Takahashi was elected Japan U-17 national team for 2007 U-17 World Cup. He played full time in all 3 matches as right side-back.

Club statistics
Updated to end of 2018 season.

National team statistics

Awards and honours

Japan
AFC U-17 Championship : 2006

References

External links
Profile at Vissel Kobe 
Profile at Urawa Red Diamonds 

Shunki Takahashi – Yahoo! Japan sports 

1990 births
Living people
Association football people from Saitama Prefecture
Japanese footballers
Japan youth international footballers
J1 League players
J2 League players
Urawa Red Diamonds players
JEF United Chiba players
Vissel Kobe players
Kashiwa Reysol players
V-Varen Nagasaki players
Association football defenders